The waterfalls of North Carolina, U.S.A., are a prominent feature of the geography of the Piedmont and mountain regions of the state, as well as a major focus of tourism and outdoor recreation. Many of these falls are located in state parks, national forests, wildlife management areas, and other public lands, as well as private property.  Many are accessible via established hiking trails, and some developed areas include boardwalks, observation platforms, picnic areas, and other amenities.  Some of the highest and most voluminous waterfalls in the eastern United States are located in North Carolina.

Many of the waterfalls in the state are located in Transylvania County, which is called "The Land of Waterfalls".  This is due to the orographic lift that results in the area having one of the highest average rainfalls in the United States (90 inches per year).

Falls by county
This list is incomplete.  Please feel free to add waterfalls to this list and to create articles about the waterfalls.

Visitors should always follow rules of safe waterfall hiking when visiting waterfalls.

Buncombe County
Although parts of Buncombe County receive less average rainfall than any other location in the Southeastern US, Buncombe County still has several waterfalls.
Cascades Waterfall (Craggy Mountains)
Douglas Falls
Glassmine Falls
Walker Falls
Reems Creek Falls

Burke County
High Shoals Falls
Linville Falls
McGalliard Falls

Clay County
Bull Cove Falls

Jackson County
Whitewater Falls

Macon County
Bridal Veil Falls (Macon County)
Cullasaja Falls
Dry Falls (North Carolina)
Quarry Falls (Macon County)
Secret Falls

Madison County
Waterfall on West Prong Hickey Fork

McDowell County
Toms Creek Falls
Catawba Falls
Hickory Branch Trail Falls
Crabtree Falls (North Carolina)

Montgomery County
Moccasin Creek Falls

Polk County
Pearson's Falls
Big Bradley Falls
Little Bradley Falls
Shunkawauken Falls

Rutherford County
Hickory Nut Falls
Rainbow Falls (Rutherford County)

Stokes County
Home to the isolated Sauratown Mountains. 
Hidden Falls (Hanging Rock)
Lower Cascades (Hanging Rock)
Tory's Falls (Hanging Rock)
Upper Cascades (Hanging Rock)
Window Falls (Hanging Rock)

Swain County
Mingo Falls
Little Falls
Juneywhank Falls
Tom Branch Falls
Indian creek Falls
Soco Falls

Transylvania County
This area receives more average annual rainfall than any other place in the Eastern United States - over 90 inches a year.
Bridal Veil Falls (DuPont State Forest)
Corbin Creek Falls
Drift Falls
High Falls (DuPont State Forest)
Hooker Falls
Log Hollow Falls
Looking Glass Falls
Moore Cove Falls
Rainbow Falls (Horsepasture River)
Silver Run Falls
Slick Rock Falls
Sliding Rock
Triple Falls (DuPont State Forest)
Turtleback Falls
Upper Whitewater Falls, part of Whitewater Falls which extends into South Carolina, which together drop over 1000' in elevation before hitting the plunge basin.

Wilkes County
Betsey's Rock Falls
Cascade Falls (Falls Creek)

Yancey County
Mitchell Falls
Roaring Fork Falls (Yancey County)
Setrock Creek Falls

See also
List of waterfalls
http://commons.wikimedia.org/wiki/Category:Waterfalls_in_North_Carolina

References

External links and resources
NCWaterfalls.com
Waterfalls in Western North Carolina
Adams, Kevin.  North Carolina Waterfalls: A Hiking and Photography Guide.  Blair Publishing, 2005.

North Carolina